MOPS (3-(N-morpholino)propanesulfonic acid) is a buffer introduced in the 1960s, one of the twenty Good's buffers. It is a structural analog to MES, and like MES, its structure contains a morpholine ring. HEPES is a similar pH buffering compound that contains a piperazine ring. With a pKa of 7.20, MOPS is an excellent buffer for many biological systems at near-neutral pH.

Applications
MOPS is frequently used as a buffering agent in biology and biochemistry. It has been tested and recommended for polyacrylamide gel electrophoresis. Usage above 20 mM in mammalian cell culture work is not recommended. MOPS buffer solutions become discolored (yellow) over time, but reportedly slight discoloration does not significantly affect the buffering characteristics.

See also
CAPS
HEPPS
Tris
Common buffer compounds used in biology

References

External links

Sigma Aldrich Buffer Calculator - Useful tool to calculate weight, volume, or concentration from molecular weight.
Recipe for MOPS buffer on OpenWetWare

Buffer solutions
Sulfonic acids
4-Morpholinyl compunds